Tyrell Fabian Johnson (10 January 1917 – 5 April 1985) was a West Indian international cricketer who played in one Test match in 1939.

Tall and thin, Johnson was a left-arm fast-medium bowler who was picked for the 1939 West Indies cricket tour to England after taking six wickets for 41 runs in a trial match in February 1939. In England, Johnson took a wicket with his first ball of the tour at Worcester, but was picked for only eight other first-class matches. That included, however, the third Test of the three-match series at The Oval, where he repeated his instant success by taking the wicket of Walter Keeton with his first delivery. He took two further wickets in the match (Len Hutton and Norman Oldfield), but managed only 16 on the tour as a whole, for a high average of 32 runs per wicket.

This single Test match was Johnson's last first-class cricket appearance.

References

1917 births
1985 deaths
West Indies Test cricketers
Trinidad and Tobago cricketers
People from Tunapuna–Piarco